Gracey is a surname. Notable people with the surname include:

Annie Ryder Gracey (1836-1908), American writer, missionary
Chad Gracey (born 1971), American musician
General Sir Douglas Gracey (1894–1964), British Indian Army officer
James S. Gracey (born 1927), Commandant of the United States Coast Guard
Yale Gracey (1910–1983), Disney Imagineer
Clarence Gracey, American football player